Iowa-Grant School District is a school district headquartered in Livingston, Wisconsin, and named for the counties in which the district is located. The district encompasses the villages of  Cobb, Linden, Livingston, Montfort, Rewey, the town of Mifflin, and the 
unincorporated communities of Edmund, and Arthur. It comprises three schools: an elementary school, a middle school, and a high school. The elementary and middle school are in the same building, which was built in 1991. Iowa-Grant high school was built in 1960.

Across from the current campus is a renovated historical one-room schoolhouse known as Hazel Dell.

The school colors are red and black. The school song is Across the Field. The school's mascot is the panther.

Sports
Iowa-Grant competes in the Southwest Wisconsin Conference (SWC), in Division 5 in football, and in Division 3 in other sports. Prior to the creation of SWAL Iowa-Grant was in the Southern 8 conference. Each year the Iowa-Grant football team plays Fennimore for the "milk can", because both communities have cheese factories. The school fight song is "Across the Field."

Conference Champions
 Football: 1974, 1975 (co-champion with Cuba City), 1976, 1977, 1979, 1988, 1993, 2005 (co-champion with Darlington), 2009 (co-champion with Darlington and Cuba City)
 Volleyball: 1997,1998
Cross Country: 1962, 1965, 2000
 Wrestling: 1973, 2006
 Golf: 2002, 2003, 2004, 2005, 2006, 2007, 2008

State Champions
 Boys Basketball: 1981
 Cross Country: 2000
 Wrestling: 2004
Football: 1977
Women's Volleyball:  1978, 1989, 1997

References

External links

 

School districts in Wisconsin
Education in Grant County, Wisconsin
Education in Iowa County, Wisconsin
1958 establishments in Wisconsin
School districts established in 1958